This is a listing of the major offices within the Lutheran churches, as well as significant individual Lutheran clergy.

Lists of Lutheran bishops and archbishops
Presidents of the Lutheran World Federation
Leading persons and bishops, Evangelical Lutheran Church in Bavaria
Presidents, Evangelical Lutheran Synod (ELS)
Land provosts and state bishop, Evangelical Lutheran State Church of Eutin (1921–1976)
List of Lutheran bishops of Hamar
Bishops of Hamburg, North Elbian Evangelical Lutheran Church (1977–2008)
Bishops of Hamburg-Lübeck, North Elbian Evangelical Lutheran Church (seat: Hamburg, 2008– to date)
State bishops, Evangelical-Lutheran State Church of Hanover  
Bishops of Helsinki
Lutheran bishops of Hólar
Bishops of Holstein-Lübeck, North Elbian Evangelical Lutheran Church (seat: Lübeck, 1977–2008)
Bishops of Iceland
List of bishops of Lund (Earlier names on the list are Catholic)
Presidents & Bishops, Lutheran Church in Malaysia and Singapore 
Leading persons and bishops, Evangelical Lutheran Church in Oldenburg
Bishops of Schleswig, Evangelical Lutheran State Church of Schleswig-Holstein (1925–1976), North Elbian Evangelical Lutheran Church (1977–2008)
Bishops of Schleswig and Holstein, North Elbian Evangelical Lutheran Church (seat: Schleswig, 2008– to date)
Bishops, Independent Evangelical Lutheran Church (SELK) 
Lutheran bishops of Skálholt  
Lutheran Bishops of Turku and Archbishops of Turku and Finland
Lutheran Archbishops of Uppsala
Presidents, Wisconsin Evangelical Lutheran Synod
Leading persons and state bishops, Evangelical State Church in Württemberg

Additional Lutheran leaders 
Johan Arnd Aasgaard (1876-1966) - President of the Evangelical Lutheran Church
Erland Carlsson (1822-1893) - One of the founders and President of the Augustana Synod
Gottlieb Bender Christiansen (1851-1929) - Founding President of the United Danish Evangelical Lutheran Church
 Claus Lauritz Clausen (1820-1892) - President of the Conference of the Norwegian-Danish Evangelical Lutheran Church of America
Elling Eielsen (1804-1883) - Founder of The Eielsen Synod (Evangelical Lutheran Church in America) 
Lars Paul Esbjörn (1808-1870) - One of the founders  of the Augustana Synod and Augustana College
Tuve Hasselquist (1816-1891) - Founding President of the Augustana Synod
Ulrik Vilhelm Koren (1826-1910) - President of the Synod of the Norwegian Evangelical Lutheran Church in America 
Christoph Kähler - Presiding bishop of the Protestant Lutheran Church in Thuringia. :de:Christoph Kähler
Margot Käßmann (b. 1958) - Bishop for the Protestant Lutheran Church of Hanover.
Jaan Kiivit, Jr (1940-2005) Former archbishop of the Evangelical Lutheran Church of Estonia.
Johan Kõpp (1874-1970)- Estonian Lutheran bishop who fled to Sweden after the Soviet takeover.:et:Johan Kõpp
Frederick Muhlenberg (1750 - 1801) - Clergy, first Speaker of US House
Heinrich Melchior Muhlenberg (1711 - 1786) - Founder of the Lutheran church in America.
Peter Muhlenberg (1746 - 1807) - Clergy, Revolutionary War soldier, US House, US Senate
Ishmael Noko (b. 1943)- General secretary of the Lutheran World Federation.
Eric Norelius (1833-1916)- One of the founders and President of the Augustana Synod 
Kuno Pajula (1924-2012) - Former archbishop of the Evangelical Lutheran Church of Estonia.
Andres Põder (b. 1949) - The current archbishop of the Evangelical Lutheran Church of Estonia.
Hans Gerhard Stub (1849-1931) - First bishop of the Evangelical Lutheran Church (United States) 
Jonas Swensson (1828-1873) - Former president of the Augustana Evangelical Lutheran Church.

List of clergy

Academics 
Thomas R. Ahlersmeyer  (b. 1954) - President of Concordia University, Ann Arbor, Michigan
Kristian Anker (1848-1928) - President of the combined Trinity Seminary and Dana College
Anton Marius Andersen (1847-1941) - Founding President of Trinity Seminary at Dana College
Georg M. Grossmann (1823-1897) - Founder of Wartburg College
Theodore Marcus Hansen (1886-1973) - President of Dana College and Trinity Seminary
John N. Kildahl (1857-1920) - Lutheran church minister, author and educator, President of St. Olaf College
O. P. Kretzmann (1901-1975) - President of Valparaiso University, Lutheran pastor, author, and professor
Peter Laurentius Larsen - Founding president of Luther College.
Knud Ejler Løgstrup - Danish philosopher and theologian. Pastor at Sandager- Holevad from 1936–1943. Professor at University of Aarhus from 1943-1975
Thorbjorn N. Mohn -  Founding president of St. Olaf College
Bernt Julius Muus - Founder of St. Olaf College
Robert Preus - Lutheran pastor, professor, author, and seminary president
Stephan Ludwig Roth - Transylvanian educationist.
Jacob Tanner (1865-1964) -  Norwegian American Lutheran educator and religious author
John Tietjen (1928-2004) - Noted for the Seminex controversy.
Peter Sørensen Vig (1854-1929) - President of Trinity Seminary and the president of Dana College

Activists 
K. G. William Dahl (1883-1917) - Lutheran minister, author and social advocate.  Founder of Bethphage  Mission.
Robert Graetz (1928-2020) - Possibly the only white member of the Montgomery Improvement Association.
Sumowood Harris - Liberian peace activist.
Bernt B. Haugan (1862-1931) - American minister, politician, and temperance leader.
Judith Hird (b. 1946) - first woman to become a Lutheran pastor.
William A. Passavant - Lutheran minister noted for bringing the Lutheran Deaconess movement to the United States. 
Roland Weisselberg (1933-2006) - Critic of the former East Germany who later committed Self-immolation as a protest against the spread of Islam.

Explorers and colonizers 
Gotthard Fritzsche - A founding figure for Australia's Lutherans.
Rasmus Jensen - One of the earliest Lutheran chaplains to go the "New World."
August Kavel - A founding figure for Australia's Lutherans.
Martin Stephan - Settled with a colony of Saxons, later excommunicated.
Reorus Torkillus - First Lutheran clergyman to settle in New Sweden

Missionaries 
Johan Campanius - Assigned to New Sweden, Missionary to the Lenape.
Hans Egede - "Apostle of Greenland."
Onesimos Nesib - Convert from Ethiopia who translated the Bible into Oromo and did missionary work in Africa. 
Bartholomäus Ziegenbalg - Possibly the first Protestant missionary in India.
Martti Rautanen (1845-1926) - First Christian missionary in Ovamboland in Namibia.
Alexander Durham Hail (1844-1923) - Possibly the first Protestant missionary in Wakayama Prefecture, Japan.
John Baxter Hail (1846-1928) - Possibly the first Protestant missionary in Wakayama Prefecture, Japan.

Politicians 
Joh Bjelke-Petersen - Former Premier of Queensland.
Kjell Magne Bondevik (b. 1947) - Former Prime Minister of Norway.
Francis Hoffmann (1822-1903) - Once Lieutenant Governor of Illinois and also wrote under a pen-name.
John Herman Koch (1864-1929) - Former Wisconsin State Assemblyman.
Antti Johannes Rantamaa (1904-1987) - Finnish chaplain who served in the Parliament of Finland.

Theologians 
Dietrich Bonhoeffer - A founding member of the Confessing Church who was executed by Nazi Germany.
Otto von Gerlach - Nineteenth-century German.
N. F. S. Grundtvig - Danish pastor, author, poet and author of hymns
Oswald Hoffmann - Clergyman and speaker on The Lutheran Hour. 
Ernst Käsemann - New Testament studies, also active against Nazism.
Johann Konrad Wilhelm Löhe - Celebrated by ELCA and LCMS.
Martin Luther - German professor of theology, composer, priest, monk, with whose teachings Lutheranism is associated. 
Martin Niemöller - Former U-boat captain who became a theologian and, after initial enthusiasm, turned against Nazism.
Jacob Aall Ottesen - Norwegian American minister, theologian and church leader
Gunnar Rosendal (1897-1988) - Swedish theologian of High Church Lutheranism.

Writers 
Caspar Aquila - Tract writer.
Johann Ernst Glück (1652-1705) - Translated the Bible into Latvian.
Paul Henkel (1854-1825) - Tract writer.
Ludwig Gotthard Kosegarten (1858-1818) - German poet.
Eduard Mörike (1804-1875) - German Romantic poet.
Olaf M. Norlie (1876-1962) - Lutheran minister, educator scholar and author
Kristian Ostergaard (1855-1931) - Danish-American Lutheran pastor, educator and author
Nancy Raabe (1954-) - Pastor, author, composer. President, Association of Lutheran Church Musicians.
Johann Adolf Schlegel (1721-1793) - Poet who wrote "Spiritual Songs" and fathered two poets.

See also 
 List of Lutheran dioceses and archdioceses
:Category:Evangelical Lutheran Church in America bishops
:Category:Presidents of the Lutheran Church–Missouri Synod
:Category:Primates of the Church of Norway

Citations 

 
Lists of Protestants
Clergy